Wetle Holte (born 4 September 1973) is a Norwegian drummer and composer known for his collaborations with Silje Neergård, Kirsti Huke, Eivind Aarset, Wibutee, Bugge Wesseltoft, Anja Garbarek, and others.

Life and career
Holte was born in Skien and is a graduate from the jazz programme at Trondheim Musikkonservatorium, where in 1996, he co-founded the jazz trio Triangle—later to become Wibutee—with Håkon Kornstad and Per Zanussi. In 1998, they released their debut album, Newborn Thing, and followed it with Eight Domestic Challenges in 2001 and Playmachine in 2004. In 2006, the trio released the Spellemannprisen-nominated album Sweet Mental.

Holte has also collaborated for over a decade with Eivind Aarset in projects like Électronique Noire and The Sonic Codex Orchestra, and he contributed to Bugge Wesseltoft's Jazzland Community in 2007.

Discography

Solo
 Hurricane featuring Kirsti Huke (2012)

Collaborations
With Wibutee
 Newborn Thing (1998)
 Eight Domestic Challenges (2001)
 Playmachine (2004)
 Sweet Mental (2006)

With Eivind Aarset
 Light Extracts (2001 – with Électronique Noire)
 Connected (2004)
 Sonic Codex (2007)
 Live Extracts (2010 – with The Sonic Codex Orchestra)

With Jazzland Community
 Jazzland Community (2007)

With Grand Telemark
 Grand Telemark (2008)

References

External links

Norwegian jazz composers
Norwegian jazz drummers
Male drummers
20th-century Norwegian drummers
21st-century Norwegian drummers
Norwegian University of Science and Technology alumni
Musicians from Skien
Living people
1973 births
20th-century drummers
Male jazz composers
20th-century Norwegian male musicians
21st-century Norwegian male musicians
Wibutee members